Binchuan County is a county in the Dali Bai Autonomous Prefecture located in the west of Yunnan Province, China.

Mount Jizu is located in Binchuan County.

Administrative divisions
Binchuan County has 8 towns and 2 ethnic townships. 
8 towns

2 ethnic townships
 Zhongying Lisu and Yi
 Lawu Yi

Ethnic groups
There are 251 Lahu in Binchuan County, most of whom reside in the following villages of Zhongying Ethnic Lisu Township (Dali Ethnic Gazetteer 2009:251).
Zhimadeng Village: Mizideng
Zhaokala Village: Yuexia, Baiyangqing, Tanggudi

The Guola people consists of 63 individuals in East Caijiawan of Binchuan County (You 2013:134). Their autonym is Nipu, and they are most closely related to the Yi of Dayao and Yanfeng. The Guola of Binchuan had originally migrated from Yanfeng County.

Climate

References

External links
 Binchuan County Official Website

County-level divisions of Dali Bai Autonomous Prefecture